In differential geometry, a ribbon (or strip) is the combination of a smooth space curve and its corresponding normal vector. Ribbons have seen particular application as regards DNA.

Properties and implications

The ribbon concept plays an important role in the Călugăreanu-White-Fuller formula, that states that

Ribbon theory investigates geometric and topological aspects of a mathematical reference ribbon associated with physical and biological properties, such as those arising in topological fluid dynamics, DNA modeling and in material science.

See also 

 Bollobás–Riordan polynomial
 Knots and graphs
 Knot theory
 DNA supercoil
 Möbius strip

References

Bibliography 
 
 
 
 

Differential geometry
Topology